Sambo at the 2017 Asian Indoor and Martial Arts Games was held in Ashgabat, Turkmenistan from 24 to 26 September 2017 at the Martial Arts Arena.

Medalists

Men

Men's combat

Women

Medal table

Results

Men

52 kg
24 September

57 kg
25 September

62 kg
26 September

68 kg
24 September

74 kg
25 September

82 kg
26 September

 Zhamalbek Asylbek Uulu of Kyrgyzstan originally won the gold medal, but was disqualified after he tested positive for Meldonium.

90 kg
24 September

Men's combat

52 kg
26 September

57 kg
24 September

62 kg
25 September

68 kg
26 September

74 kg
24 September

82 kg
25 September

90 kg
26 September

100 kg
24 September

+100 kg
25 September

Women

48 kg
24 September

52 kg
25 September

56 kg
26 September

60 kg
24 September

64 kg
25 September

68 kg
26 September

72 kg
24 September

References 

 Medalists by events

External links
 Official website

2017 Asian Indoor and Martial Arts Games events
Asian Indoor and Martial Arts Games